David Keelan Mathias (born 20 March 1991) is an Indian-born cricketer who represents the Bahrain national cricket team.

Mathias grew up in Bahrain where his father Richard Mathias was the director of youth cricket for the Bahrain Cricket Association. He attended Sacred Heart School in Isa Town and was also coached in the UAE by Tauseef Ahmed and Shahzad Altaf. At the age of 12, he represented Bahrain at the 2004 ACC Under-17 Cup in India.

Mathias has represented Karnataka in Indian domestic cricket. He made his first-class debut on 22 October 2015 in the 2015–16 Ranji Trophy. 

In February 2022, Mathias was named in Bahrain's Twenty20 International (T20I) squad for the 2022 ICC Men's T20 World Cup Global Qualifier A tournament. He made his T20I debut on 18 February 2022, for Bahrain against Germany.

References

External links
 

1991 births
Living people
Indian cricketers
Bahraini cricketers
Bahrain Twenty20 International cricketers
Karnataka cricketers
Cricketers from Karnataka
Indian expatriates in Bahrain